Alan Byron (8 October 1936 – 11 March 1982) was an Australian rules footballer who played for the Geelong Football Club in the Victorian Football League (VFL).

Notes

External links 

1936 births
1982 deaths
Australian rules footballers from Victoria (Australia)
Geelong Football Club players
Portland Football Club players